The Wallace Touroplane was a late 1920s U.S. three seat, high wing cabin monoplane. About 20 were built.

Design and development

In 1928 Stanley Wallace set up a company to produce a three seat, high wing monoplane which he had designed and named the Touroplane. It was powered by an  Anzani radial engine and as many as six of these may have been built. In 1929 Wallace Aircraft Co. marketed a development designated Touroplane B which had a  Kinner K-5 radial. During 1929 Wallace Aircraft became a division of American Eagle, who called the type B the 330 Touroplane.

The wing of the Touroplane was of blunted rectangular plan, built on twin spruce spars and fabric-covered. Its ailerons, which reached over half the span from the wingtips, had tube metal structures. The wings were mounted on the upper fuselage structure over the cabin and braced to the lower fuselage longerons by pairs of struts which converged slightly from the lower fuselage longerons to the spars.

The Touroplane's Kinner engine was mounted with cylinders exposed for cooling. The fuselage was a welded, flat-sided, steel tube structure and was fabric-covered. The cabin placed pilot and co-pilot (or student or passenger) side by side under the leading edge of the wing, with a windscreen reaching forwards of it and with side windows. Dual controls were fitted. A third seat was placed centrally behind them, with its own windows. Access was via windowed doors under mid-chord, between the wing struts.

The tube steel tail was conventional with a flight-adjustable tailplane mounted on top of the fuselage carrying rounded elevators. Its fin was straight-edged, with a rounded tip and was braced to the tailplane. The unbalanced rudder was full and rounded.

Its mainwheels, fitted with brakes, were on split axles from the central fuselage underside. Oleo strut legs and drag struts were mounted on the lower longerons. It had a long, sprung, tailskid.

The original Touroplane first flew in 1928 though the date is not known. The prototype type B gained its ATC in 1929, then still Anzani-powered. Later, it was fitted with a  Wright J-5 radial. After the prototype 13 were produced. Some were flown with other engines: two had Curtiss OX-5s and one a seven cylinder  MacClatchie Panther radial. The latter was designated type C-31.

Variants
Wallace Touroplane1928 version with a  Anzani radial engine.
Wallace Touroplane B 1929 development with a  Kinner radial engine.
Wallace Touroplane C-31 as Touroplane B but with a  MacClatchie radial.
American Eagle 330 Touroplane as Touroplane B.

Specifications (Touroplane B)

References

Single-engined tractor aircraft
High-wing aircraft
1920s United States sport aircraft